These are assets owned by the Studio 100 Group (Studio 100 NV).

Companies
A list of all companies that are a subsidiary of Studio 100 NV.

Other assets
 Studio 100 Pop-Up Theater
 Dansstudio IJvi Hagelstein VZW

Former assets

References

Mass media lists
Mass media in Belgium